Adamovo is a rural locality (a selo) in Barguzinsky District, Republic of Buryatia, Russia. The population was 185 as of 2010. There are 4 streets.

Geography 
Adamovo is located 29 km southwest of Barguzin (the district's administrative centre) by road. Zorino is the nearest rural locality.

References 

Rural localities in Barguzinsky District